Air France Flight 212 was a passenger flight operated by a Boeing 707, registration F-BHSZ, that crashed on 3 December 1969. None of the 62 people on board survived.

Circumstances 
On 3 December 1969, Flight 212, which originated from Santiago International Airport, was flying to Paris, France via Lima, Peru, Guayaquil, Ecuador, Bogota, Colombia, Caracas, Venezuela, Pointe-à-Pitre, Guadeloupe, and Lisbon, Portugal. The aircraft took off on the Caracas – Pointe-à-Pitre leg from Caracas airport's runway 08R at 19:02 local time (23:02 UTC).

The causes of the disaster remain unknown because the French Bureau Investigations et Accidents (BEA) did not publish an investigation report. Documents relating to the BEA investigation are classified in the French national archives as 19880360/49 and 19880360/50, and will not be released until 2029, sixty years after the accident. However, in July 2017, several pilot unions (ALTER, SNGAF, SNOMAC, SNPL Air France ALPA, SNPNC, SPAF, UNAC, PNC UNSA) requested the files be declassified early.

Various conspiracy theories about the crash have arisen: maneuvers to avoid colliding with a nearby Avro 748 followed by a loss of control, bombing, spatial disorientation, in-flight-fire, engine failure, and/or fuel contamination. Documents classified "defense secret" from the BEA and the Paris Police Prefecture would investigate the probability of a bomb-related explosion on board the aircraft. If any of these were confirmed, this accident would be the first act of terrorism against French civilian aeronautics, and one of the first airliner attacks in the world..

Victims 
All 62 people on board were killed, including:
 11 crew members (4 flight crew + 7 flight attendants) ;
 51 passengers, including 10 crew members deadheading (4 flight crew + 6 flight attendants).

Notes

References

Sources

Aviation accidents and incidents in 1969
Accidents and incidents involving the Boeing 707
212
Aviation accidents and incidents in Venezuela
1969 in Venezuela
December 1969 events in South America
Conspiracy theories involving aviation incidents
1969 disasters in Venezuela